The Party of the Civilizational Alternative ( Hizb al-Badil al-Hadari) is an Islamo-democratic political party in Morocco.

In the 2007 parliamentary elections, the party did not win any seats. The party was supposedly banned in early 2008 (a few months after the 2007 elections), but as no written records exist proving it was banned, according to Moroccan law, the party is technically "frozen" rather than banned.

Structure
Secretary-General: Mustapha Moatassim
Deputy Secretary-General: Zahira Brini
Spokesman: Mohammed El Amine Ragala

History
Founded in 2002, the party was not recognised by the Moroccan Interior Ministry until 2005. The founding principles were freedom, equality, equity and democracy. They are mobilized for the same conviction: "a real alternative to the crisis in our country is possible."

Party dissolution
Following the arrests of senior party leader following a terrorism investigation ("Belliraj network"), Prime Minister Abbas El Fassi announced on February 20, 2008 that the party would be forcibly dissolved.

Both the secretary-general and the spokesman of the party were detained from February 2008 to April 14, 2011.

A US diplomatic cable dated February 22, 2008 and released by WikiLeaks states that "the main arrested politicians were generally viewed as moderates, who had contacts with the Embassy", that "When we met them in the spring in 2007, the tone of their discourse was moderate, without any hints of extremism, and they had reputation of being leftist-Islamist" and that "The Moroccan Association of Human Rights (AMDH), a far-left human rights NGO that traditionally has had cool relations with Islamist political parties, criticized the GOM's [Government of Morocco] arrest of the politicians, calling for their release, and denouncing the banning of the Al-Badli Al-Hadari party".

On April 18, 2012, Mustapha Moatassim introduced a request before Prime Minister Abdelilah Benkirane to lift the freeze of the party.

According to the Rabat Court of Appeal, there is actually no proof to confirm the dissolution decision, no trace in the Official Bulletin, no minutes of the Administrative Court, both required according to the Law on political parties.

References

2002 establishments in Morocco
Banned Islamist parties
Islamic democratic political parties
Political parties established in 2002
Political parties in Morocco